The Church of Saint Étienne is a Roman Catholic church located in Vignory, Haute-Marne, Grand Est, France.

It was first constructed within the medieval town near the place where the "miracle of Saint Crepin" occurred. It was mentioned in the beginning of the 9th century in the archives of the Abbey of Luxeuil.  Charlemagne funded it from the royal treasury.  However, there is nothing left of the Carolingian church.

History 
In 1032, Gui, the first known Lord of Vignory, decided to create a college of canons and build a church for them.  His son Roger replaced the canons with Benedictine monks and gave the newly built church to the Abbey of Saint-Bénigne of Dijon.  He then built a new church with two bays in the choir and four bays in the nave.  Building stopped until 1049.  Monks were sent to live there in 1051 and 1057.  The church was shared by the monks and parishioners.

The tower was added in the 12th century by parishioners.  Later a chapel was added and the windows enlarged for more light.  Five chapels were added along the aisle on the south side between the end of the 14th century and the 16th century.  The nave was lengthened by two bays and given a new facade.  

The Carolingian interior was retained and between 1843 and 1852 it was restored by architect Émile Boeswillwald.

Architecture 
The church follows the traditions of basilicas of the high Middle Ages but experiments with a three-level elevation with a clerestory.  The column capitals exhibit simple sculpture which would later be elaborated.

It is one of the oldest examples of an ambulatory with three radiating chapels.

Bibliography 

 Edited by Jean-Marie Pérouse de Montclos - Le guide du Patrimoine: Champagne-Ardenne - pp.393-396 - Hachette - Paris - 1995 - 
 Hubert Collin, Marie-Clotilde Hubert, André Massat, Anne Prache, Henri Ronot - Champagne romane - pp.299-348 - Éditions Zodiaque (collection "la nuit des temps" n°55) - La Pierre-qui-Vire - 1981

Gallery

Churches in Haute-Marne
11th-century Roman Catholic church buildings in France
Monuments historiques of Grand Est
Romanesque architecture in France